Petropavlovka is a rural locality (a selo) in Baranovsky Selsoviet, Narimanovsky District, Astrakhan Oblast, Russia. The population was 375 as of 2010. There are 10 streets.

Geography 
Petropavlovka is located 23 km north of Narimanov (the district's administrative centre) by road. Baranovka is the nearest rural locality.

References 

Rural localities in Narimanovsky District